The APW Universal Heavyweight Championship is a professional wrestling world heavyweight championship contested in All Pro Wrestling. It was introduced on October 12, 1996, when Robert Thompson became the first champion.

Title history

Combined reigns

See also
All Pro Wrestling
APW Tag Team Championship
APW Worldwide Internet Championship

References

External links
Universal Heavyweight Championship History on Solie.org

All Pro Wrestling championships
Heavyweight wrestling championships